Keith Hobbs is a former association football player who represented New Zealand at international level.

Hobbs made his full All Whites debut in a 2–0 win over Fiji on 20 February 1980 and ended his international playing career with eight A-international caps to his credit, his final cap also in a 2–0 win over Fiji, on 7 June 1985.

Hobbs was the first player to appear in 300 games in the New Zealand National Soccer League, a feat he achieved in 1988

References 

Year of birth missing (living people)
Living people
Association footballers not categorized by position
New Zealand association footballers
New Zealand international footballers
1980 Oceania Cup players
North Shore United AFC players
Papatoetoe AFC players